Mavis Fan (born 27 February 1977) is a Taiwanese singer and actress.

Life and career
Fan began her singing career in the mid 90s as a pop idol, singing songs catered mostly towards children and young teenagers.

Fan was raised only by her mother, since her parents separated when she was just two years old. Her mom forged her unbreakable bond with music. She was sent to learn the flute and piano at the age of three, since her mom, an aspiring singer, had put all of her own musical dreams in Fan. They led a tight life. Her mom had to sing at bars to afford Mavis' tuition for the best music school in Taiwan.

Fan did not let her mom down. She began to sing on stage at 14. Time has brought about many changes to both her life and her music, but her passion for expression has never changed. At 17 years old, she began to sing children's songs. In the late 1990s, she adopted a more mature image, singing in a variety of pop styles for a more general audience and captured significant amounts of popular attention.

Film
Her film debut was in The Private Eye Blues in 1995. She played the role of A-Su in the 2005 film About Love.

Discography

Your Sweetness

When Mavis entered the Taiwan music scene in the mid-90s, she was first packaged as a sweet little girl. Her music company came up with the idea of featuring children's songs on her albums. Her first records got incredible sales, so that each album sold over a million copies, thus giving her nickname – "Little Witch of Music."

Darling (1998)

Fragile, childish and sentimental, just like the humid air of her island home, that was Darling, the title track of Mavis' 1998 album of the same name. This song came after a break-up, when Mavis was in New York filming the video for "Bartender Angel."

Darling is overall a pretty comfortable pop album, thanks to brilliant collaborations between Mavis and other musicians from Hong Kong and the mainland.

I Want Us To Be Together (1999)

In 1999, the album "I Want Us To Be Together," the follow-up to "Darling," came out as yet another Mavis do-my-own-music manifesto. That was I Want Us to Be Together. For the first time, Mavis took the job of music executive and contributed half of the composition on the album. She delivered on her promise, winning best pop album at the 11th Taiwan Gold Melody Awards, Taiwan's equivalent of the Grammys.  She said, "I'm not that public idol kind of girl. I don't want to be either. Actually, I do enjoy being loved by a small group of people, just a small group, because they make me feel special."

Sometimes (1999–2000)

Mavis' two transition albums never achieved as much commercial success as critical success.

You Don't Trust Me Anymore (2001)

That was You Don't Trust Me Anymore, written by Mavis and co-produced by her boyfriend Laurence Chow. The song is published on Mavis' 2001 album Lounge Diva. Rumors said Mavis developed depression during her transition period, because she put herself under too much pressure to produce good music. She confirmed this in her book, "Scratch", released this year.

Although she had flowers and applause, Mavis said she was not content. She said, "I'm sure that isn't what I want. I have a clear goal, if I can't achieve it there is nothing to for me to feel good about."

Filmography

Films 
 The Private Eye Blues (1994)
 About Love (2005)
 Lover's Discourse (2010)
 The Flying Swords of Dragon Gate (2011)
 The Silent War (2012)
 Refresh 3+7 / 刷新3+7 (nano-movie, 2012)
 Afternoon Delight! (2013)
 Joy Division (2013)
 Will You Still Love Me Tomorrow? (2013)
 Heartfall Arises (2016)

Television 
 Nowhere Man (2019)

References

External links
 

1977 births
Living people
Taiwanese Buddhists
Musicians from Taipei
Taiwanese film actresses
Taiwanese Mandopop singers
Actresses from Taipei
20th-century Taiwanese actresses
21st-century Taiwanese actresses
20th-century Taiwanese women singers
21st-century Taiwanese women singers